The Burnelli UB-14, also known as the Cunliffe-Owen Clyde Clipper, was a 1930s American prototype lifting-fuselage airliner designed and built by Vincent Burnelli.

Design and development
Following on from his earlier designs Vincent Burnelli designed a commercial transport version using the lifting-fuselage concept. Burnelli's designs were based on the idea that an airfoil-section fuselage would contribute to the lift generated. The Burnelli UB-14 first flew in 1934, the airfoil-section fuselage was the centre-section of the wing. The aircraft had twin tailbooms and a widespan tailplane and elevator fitted with twin fins and rudders. The UB-14 had retractable landing gear and was powered by two Pratt & Whitney radial engines.  An enclosed cockpit for the crew of two was located on the centre wing's upper surface. The cabin held 14 to 18 passengers.

Operational history
The first prototype, UB-14, was destroyed in a 1935 accident attributed to faulty maintenance on the aileron control system. 
Burnelli then designed and built an improved version, the UB-14B. A modified version of the UB-14B design was built under licence in the United Kingdom by Cunliffe-Owen Aircraft, powered by two Bristol Perseus XIVC radials as the Cunliffe-Owen OA-1. A contemporary photo shows the mockup of the original UB-14B, to be built by Scottish Aviation before bankruptcy. This design was to have had streamline inline engines. The OA-1 used radial engines.

In September 1936, Burnelli applied to the CAA for approval to fly a transatlantic flight with Clyde Edward Pangborn as the selected pilot.

The Cunliffe-Owen failed its airworthiness certification due to excessive takeoff run and poor workmanship. It was performance tested at the A&AEE Boscombe Down in 1939.

After appropriate work, in June 1941 Jim Mollison and an Air Transport Auxiliary crew delivered Cunliffe-Owen OA-1 G-AFMB to Fort Lamy, Chad. The aircraft was fitted out as a personal transport for General De Gaulle. It was later abandoned at RAF Kabrit in Egypt, and burned during VJ-Day celebrations. The one other aircraft landed in Vichy France en route to Fort Lamy

Variants
 UB-14 Prototype, powered by Pratt & Whitney engines. Built by Burnelli Company.  Destroyed  13 January 1935, without injury to those aboard.  
 UB-14B Second prototype with modifications.  Built by Burnelli Company.
 UB-14B Third prototype, modified from second unit. Built by Cunliffe Owen Aircraft in United Kingdom.

Specifications (UB-14B)

Airfoils:
 Fuselage: NACA 4323
 Exterior wing, root: NACA 2412
 Exterior wing, tip: NACA 2409

See also

References

Notes

Bibliography

 The Illustrated Encyclopedia of Aircraft (Part Work 1982–1985). London: Orbis Publishing, 1986.
 Mason, Tim. The Secret Years: Flight Testing at Boscombe Down, 1939–1945. Crowborough, UK: Hikoki Publications, 2010. .

External links

Photographs of the Burnelli UB-14

UB-14
1930s United States airliners
Lifting bodies
High-wing aircraft
Aircraft first flown in 1934
Twin piston-engined tractor aircraft
Cunliffe-Owen aircraft